A RAM press (or ram press) is a machine, invented in the USA in the mid-1940s, that is used to press clay into moulded shapes, such as plates and bowls. In operation a slice of de-aired clay body is placed in between two shaped porous moulds, and vertical movement of the moulds presses the body into the required shape.

History
The patented RAM Process was devised around 1945 by the ceramics engineers Reif Blackburn and Richard Steele. The first RAM Press was made by Harold Dawson in Columbus, Ohio.
Blackburn and Steele sold their company to the Wallace Murray Corp. RAM Products Inc. of Columbus, Ohio was set up in 1979 and now manufactures the RAM press, as do other companies.

Other uses

The phrase ram press (in lower case) commonly means the same thing; it is simply used for machines that press items by a mechanical ram, such as with a plunger, piston, force pump, or hydraulic ram.

References

External links
Ram Press Manufacturer Site

Pottery
American inventions